Maria, Duchess of Sudermania - Swedish: Hertiginnan Maria av Södermanland - may refer to:

Maria of the Palatinate-Simmern, Swedish princess (consort) 1579
Maria Pavlovna, Swedish princess (consort) 1908